Willy Andresen (18 October 1921 – 17 June 2016) was a Norwegian jazz pianist.

He was born in Oslo, and was appointed at the Norwegian Broadcasting Corporation from 1959 to 1991.

He often backed singer Erik Bye during his performances in Norway and the United States. He was in charge of several of the song recordings by child star Grethe Kausland, and composed the melody of Otto Nielsen's song "Pappa'n til Tove Mette".

References

1921 births
2016 deaths
Musicians from Oslo
Norwegian jazz musicians
NRK people